How to Win at Checkers (Every Time) (Thai title: พี่ชาย My Hero) is a 2015 internationally co-produced drama film directed by Josh Kim. It was screened in the Panorama section of the 65th Berlin International Film Festival, and was selected as the Thai entry for the Best Foreign Language Film at the 88th Academy Awards, but it was not nominated. The film is based on the short stories "At the Café Lovely" and "Draft Day" by Rattawut Lapcharoensap.

Cast
 Toni Rakkaen as Adult Oat
 Ingkarat Damrongsakkul as Oat
 Thira Chutikul as Ek
 Jinn Jinna Navarat as Jai
 Natarat Lakha as Kitty
 Kowit Wattanakul as Sia
 Nuntita Khampiranon as Singer
 Michael Shaowanasai as Customer
 Anawat Patanawanichkul as Junior
 Vatanya Thamdee as Auntie

See also
 List of lesbian, gay, bisexual or transgender-related films of 2015
 List of submissions to the 88th Academy Awards for Best Foreign Language Film
 List of Thai submissions for the Academy Award for Best Foreign Language Film

References

External links
 
 

2015 films
2015 drama films
Thai drama films
American drama films
Thai-language films
Thai LGBT-related films
2015 LGBT-related films
LGBT-related drama films
Thai coming-of-age films
Films based on multiple works
2010s American films